The Northwest Missouri State Bearcats football program represents Northwest Missouri State University in college football. They participate in Division II sports within the NCAA. The team plays their home games at Bearcat Stadium, located on campus in Maryville, Missouri.

They have appeared in ten NCAA Division II national title games – winning six – since going 0–11 in Mel Tjeerdsma's first season in 1994. The Bearcats have made the playoffs in 20 seasons and have also won or shared 30 MIAA titles.

Northwest Missouri State plays its games at Bearcat Stadium, built in 1917, and the oldest NCAA Division II stadium still in use. The field was expanded to 6,500 seats and a video screen was added in 2003 after Tjeerdsma began his run. This screen was replaced in 2014 by a 20-foot by 40-foot high-resolution screen with the scoreboard attached underneath.

Previously, Northwest Missouri played its games with Pittsburg State University at Arrowhead Stadium in Kansas City, Missouri in the Fall Classic at Arrowhead. The series was discontinued in 2013, games are now played on campus sites. Pittsburg has made four national title appearances since 1991. The October 17, 2002 game was witnessed by 26,695—the largest number in MIAA history.

Conference
Northwest was one of the original 1912 organizers of the Mid-America Intercollegiate Athletics Association. The school has not played in any other conference. The conference headquarters until 1997 was in the Maryville, Missouri home of its first commissioner Ken B. Jones. In 1997 it moved to Overland Park, Kansas and has subsequently moved to Kansas City.

Championships

National championship seasons

Conference championship seasons 
 Conference Championships (30)

NCAA Division II championship games

1998

In 1998, the Bearcats won the NCAA Division II football national championship by going 15–0. It was the first time in history a Division II school won 15 games and the first time a Northwest athletic program won a team national championship in any sport.

1999

In 1999 Northwest defeated Carson-Newman College 58–52 in four overtimes to defend the title. The game was the longest in NCAA football playoff history in number of extra periods, surpassing six contests that were extended by three overtimes. The broadcast analyst on ESPN called it the best college football game he'd ever seen. The game solidified ESPN's interest in Division II football, prompting ESPN to cover the semi-final games.

2005

In 2005 the Bearcats were a Cinderella team, ranked 22nd at the start of the playoffs, but they won all of their playoff games on the road until reaching the finals against Grand Valley State University. Northwest led the game until the closing minutes and still almost pulled the game out. The Cinderella nature of Northwest coming from 22nd to challenge the #1 team in the final has been evoked as a weakness of the Bowl Championship Series, where such a run would be impossible.

2006

In the 2006 regular season the Bearcats went undefeated at 11–0. In their third playoff game, a game played against Bloomsburg University, ESPNU televised the game live from Maryville. This was the first nationally televised game from Bearcat Stadium. The game was also the first time that temporary lights (provided by ESPN) were used at Bearcat Stadium, its lights having been removed in 1977. The Bearcats went 3–0 in the playoffs, thus earning a rematch against the Grand Valley State University Lakers in the NCAA Division II National Championship Game at Florence, Alabama, on December 16, 2006. The Bearcats fell to GVSU 17–14 after turning the ball over four times during the game.

2007

In the 2007 regular season the Bearcats went 9–1. Their only loss was to the #1 University of Nebraska at Omaha, who went 12–0 in the regular season. The Bearcats received a first round bye. In the second round, they faced #3 West Texas A&M University at Bearcat Stadium, and won with a final score of 56–28. In the quarterfinals the Bearcats traveled to Chadron, Nebraska to face #1 Chadron State College. Xavier Omon lead the Bearcats to a 26–13 victory by rushing for a personal best . The Bearcats faced their long-time post-season rivals Grand Valley State University in the semifinals. Both Grand Valley and Northwest were #2 seeds in their respective regions, but the NCAA stated that due to Northwest's strength of schedule, Northwest would receive the home game. The game was broadcast from Bearcat Stadium on ESPN2; this was the second nationally televised game from Bearcat Stadium. The game was close through the third quarter. At the beginning of the fourth quarter Northwest lead the close contest, 17–16. But after a Northwest interception that produced a touchdown, and a  Xavier Omon touchdown run, the Bearcats prevailed with a final score of 34–16, ending Grand Valley's NCAA record-setting 40-game winning streak. The Bearcats lost to #8 Valdosta State University in the NCAA Division II football national championship at 12pm (Eastern) on Saturday December 15, 2007 in Florence, Alabama; the game was broadcast on ESPN2.

2008

In 2008 the Bearcats played in their fourth consecutive national title game and lost to Minnesota-Duluth, which had a 15–0 season. Northwest has never lost a championship by more than seven points.

2009

In 2009, the Bearcats made its fifth consecutive national title appearance. No NCAA team in any division has ever done that. The Bearcats, which were ranked #2 going into the playoffs, received a first round bye. In the second round they avenged their only loss of the season by defeating Abilene Christian. In the closest game of the playoffs they defeated Central Washington University (ranked #1 at the time) in the quarterfinals by rallying in the second half and then blocking a Central Washington extra point in the closing seconds. In the semifinals it defeated California University of Pennsylvania to qualify for its third meeting in the finals with Grand Valley.

2013

Northwest won its fourth title in 2013 defeating the Lenoir-Rhyne Bears 43–28.  It was the first Bearcat national championship game not coached by Mel Tjeerdsma, who retired after losing in the semi finals in 2010. He was succeeded by Scott Bostwick who had been with Tjeerdsma during his entire tenure at Northwest including Tjeerdsma's initial 0–11 team in 1994. Bostwick passed died 6 months later, before coaching a game as a head coach. Adam Dorrel, the offensive coordinator, became the head coach. Tjeerdsma came out of retirement in 2013 to become Northwest's athletic director.  The Bearcats were undefeated 11–0 in the regular season and won the 4 playoff games.  The game was the last title game at Braly Stadium in Alabama.  The MIAA, sparked by the success of Northwest and Pittsburg, successfully bid to host the championship games starting in 2014 at Children's Mercy Park in Kansas City, Kansas about 100 miles south of the Northwest campus.

2015

Northwest took on the Shepherd Rams at Children's Mercy Park in Kansas City, Kansas on December 19. The game was the Bearcats' ninth appearance in the national title game and first at its new site in Kansas City. Northwest took home their fifth national title since 1998, second under head coach Adam Dorrel, defeating Shepherd 34–7.

2016 

Northwest played the University of North Alabama for the 2016 Division II Championship in a snowstorm. This was the Bearcats' 10th appearance in the national title game and its second trip to the title game in Kansas City. Northwest Missouri State picked up its sixth title when the Bearcats defeated North Alabama, 29-3.

Post season results
At the conclusion of the 2018 season Northwest is 52–18 in post-season play. It has been in the playoffs every year since 2004 and is 41–12 in that string and been in the national title game eight times (winning four).

Records

Coaching death
On June 5, 2011 Bearcats head coach Scott Bostwick died of an apparent heart attack in Maryville. The 49-year-old Bostwick had been named head coach of the Bearcats in December 2010 following the retirement of longtime coach Mel Tjeerdsma. Bostwick had been on the Northwest coaching staff since 1994, and most recently had served as defensive coordinator under Tjeerdsma. In 2007, Bostwick had been voted the American Football Coaches Association Division II Assistant Coach of the Year.

Notable players and coaches

 Josh Baker – National Football League tight end who is currently a free agent.
 Baron Corbin (Thomas "Tom" Pestock) – Former offensive lineman for Indianapolis Colts and Arizona Cardinals.  Now a professional wrestler signed with WWE.
 Brandon Dixon – defensive back who currently plays for the Pittsburgh Steelers.
 Brian Dixon – defensive back who currently plays for the Arizona Cardinals.
 Tommy Frevert – American football placekicker
 Chris Greisen – former quarterback in the NFL.
 Chad Kilgore – NFL linebacker who is currently a free agent.
 Matt Longacre – National Football League defensive end for the Los Angeles Rams.
 Tony Miles – retired CFL wide receiver; school's all-time leader in receptions, receiving yards and receiving touchdowns.
 Xavier Omon – retired NFL running back.
 Michael Peterson – Retired tight end. Former player with the Omaha Nighthawks of the United Football League.
 Jamaica Rector – former NFL and CFL wide receiver.
 Mel Tjeerdsma – Northwest's national championship winning coach, and most winning DII post-season coach with 22 victories.
 Dave Tollefson – Retired NFL defensive end.
 Seth Wand – Former NFL offensive lineman

References

External links
 

 
American football teams established in 1908
1908 establishments in Missouri